The Austin City Council is the unicameral legislature of the city of Austin, Texas, United States of America. The mayor is included as a member of the council and presides over all council meetings and ceremonies. The current mayor of Austin is Kirk Watson. The duty of the council is to decide the city budget, taxes, and various other ordinances. While the council is officially nonpartisan, all but one current council member are affiliated with the Democratic Party.

Before 2012, the council was composed of six at-large elected members and the mayor, and members could only serve three terms (nine years) on the council. However, in 2012 the citizens of Austin approved two propositions that established ten single-member districts within the city and assigned council and mayoral seats staggered four-year terms, with members limited to two terms. However, the mayor remains as the 11th member on the council, an arrangement known as 10-1. The new setup was first implemented after the 2014 elections.

Duties

The duty of the Austin City Council is to oversee and decide on the city budget, local taxes, amendment of laws, and creation of ordinances and policies. The council members meet every Thursday. There are several boards and commissions that are composed of non-elected appointed citizens to give advice and recommendations to council members. These board generally review, debate, and comment on recommendations for the council.

Members
Members of the council are elected to 4 years terms and can serve a maximum of 2 terms. The current council was elected in 2018. The council is officially nonpartisan; however, all but one current council members and the mayor are affiliated with the Democratic Party.

History
The city of Austin was officially incorporated by the Fourth Congress of the Republic of Texas on December 27, 1839. The city was established at the confluence of the Colorado River and Shoal Creek, which was then the site of a small community known as Waterloo. The city was founded to act as the capital of the Republic of Texas and was named in honor of Stephen F. Austin, the so-called Founder of Texas. The governmental structure established by the original Austin charter called for "one mayor, and eight Aldermen", with the mayor being elected city-wide, and each Alderman representing one of the city's eight wards. Austin had its first mayoral election on January 13, 1840, in which citizens elected Edwin Waller to be the city's first mayor.

References

External links 
Council Meeting Information

Government of Austin, Texas
Texas city councils